CFR Title 49 - Transportation is one of fifty titles comprising the United States Code of Federal Regulations (CFR). Title 49 is the principal set of rules and regulations (sometimes called administrative law) issued by the Departments of Transportation and Homeland Security, federal agencies of the United States regarding transportation and transportation-related security. This title is available in digital and printed form, and can be referenced online using the Electronic Code of Federal Regulations (e-CFR).

History 
Publication of Title 49 began in 1938, at which point it was entitled Transportation and Railroads. It was renamed in 1949 to Transportation.

Current structure 

The table of contents, as reflected in the e-CFR updated February 18, 2014, is as follows:

 49
Transportation in the United States